Bromoureides are sedative-hypnotics available mainly in Europe, including acecarbromal, bromisoval, and carbromal (Horowitz, 1997). They are a subfamily of the ureides (acylureas).

See also
 Apronal

References
 Horowitz, B., "Bromism from Excessive Cola Consumption," Clinical Toxicology, 35(3), 1997, pp. 315–320.

Hypnotics
Organobromides
Sedatives
Ureas